is a railway station located in Fushimi-ku, Kyoto, Kyoto Prefecture, Japan, operated by West Japan Railway Company (JR West). It has the station number "JR-D05".

Lines
Momoyama Station is served by the Nara Line.

Layout
The station has one island platform and one side platform serving three tracks in total.

Platforms

History
Station numbering was introduced in March 2018 with Momoyama being assigned station number JR-D05.

Passenger statistics
According to the Kyoto Prefecture statistical report, the average number of passengers per day is as follows.

Adjacent stations

References

External links

  

Railway stations in Japan opened in 1895
Railway stations in Kyoto Prefecture